Los Fayos is a municipality located in the province of Zaragoza, Aragon, Spain. According to the 2010 census the municipality has a population of 153 inhabitants. Its postal code is 50513.

The town is built below a red cliff.

References

External links

Los Fayos Information

Municipalities in the Province of Zaragoza